The Ambala Brigade was an infantry brigade of the British Indian Army that formed part of the Indian Army during the First World War.  It was formed in November 1914 to replace the original Ambala Brigade that had been mobilized as the 3rd (Ambala) Cavalry Brigade for service on the Western Front.  It remained in India throughout the war.  

The brigade continued to exist between the World Wars and by September 1939 it was designated Ambala Brigade Area.  It was broken up in 1941.

History
At the outbreak of the First World War, the Ambala Cavalry Brigade was part of the 3rd (Lahore) Division.  It was mobilized in August 1914 as the 3rd (Ambala) Cavalry Brigade, assigned to the newly formed 1st Indian Cavalry Division and sailed from Bombay on 16 October for the Western Front.  Likewise, the 3rd (Lahore) Division was transferred to France in August 1914.  The 3rd Lahore Divisional Area was formed in September 1914 to take over the area responsibilities of the 3rd (Lahore) Division and on 11 November 1914 a new Ambala Brigade was formed in 3rd Lahore Divisional Area to replace the original brigade.  The brigade served with the division in India until May 1917.

From December 1916, the 16th Indian Division began forming as a reserve division for the North-West Frontier eventually taking over the responsibilities and brigades of the 3rd Lahore Divisional Area: 44th (Ferozepore) Brigade in February 1917 and the Ambala and 45th (Jullundur) Brigades in May.  It remained with the new division until June 1918 when it became an independent formation.

The brigade continued to exist after the end of the war.  By 1926 it had been redesignated as Ambala Brigade Area.  It was broken up in 1941.

Orders of battle

Commanders
The Ambala Brigade had the following commanders:

See also

 3rd (Ambala) Cavalry Brigade for the original brigade

Notes

References

Bibliography

External links
 
 

Brigades of India in World War I
Military units and formations established in 1914
Military units and formations disestablished in 1941